Robert (or Bob) Hanson (or Hansen or Hanssen) may refer to:

Entertainment
 Robert Emil Hansen (1860–1926), Danish composer and cellist
 Robert Hanson (director) (born 1946), director of the Elgin Symphony Orchestra and composer
 Robert Hansen (actor) (born 1979), Danish actor
 Robert Hanson, a character in the 2002 film Abandon
 Bob Hanson, character in the 2010 film Legion

Sports
 Bob Hansen (baseball) (born 1948), Major League Baseball first baseman
 Bob Hansen (born 1961), basketball player
 Bob Hanson (American football), see List of Montana Grizzlies in the NFL draft
 Bob Hanson (basketball), see List of presidents of the National Association of Basketball Coaches

Other
 Robert Hanson (priest) (1866–1947), Anglican chaplain
 Robert Hanson (United States Army Air Forces) (1920–2005), American Army pilot
 Robert Hanson (financier) (born 1960), British financier and businessman
 Robert E. Hanson (1947–2015), North Dakota politician
 Robert M. Hanson (1920–1944), United States Marine Corps aviator
 Robert B. Hansen (1925–2005), Attorney General of Utah
 Robert W. Hansen (1911–1997), American jurist from Wisconsin
 Robert Hansen (1939–2014), American serial killer
 Robert Hanssen (born 1944), FBI agent and KGB spy